Arun Kumar Aravind is an Indian film director, editor and producer who works predominantly in Malayalam cinema.

Biography 

Arun Kumar Aravind, was better known as the editor of director Priyadarshan, owns to his credit a span of 10 years' experience as a film editor. Arun, who hails from Thiruvananthapuram, had done his schooling in St. Thomas Residential School, graduated from M.G. College, Trivandrum with a B.SC in Physics and later moved to Chennai to master Visual Effects from Pentamedia. He started his career as visual effect artist with Pentamedia

Arun Kumar Aravind has been director Priyadarshan's, principal editor from Vettam (2004) onwards before he turned to filmmaking with Cocktail. He edited Priyadarshan's Tamil film Kanchivaram which got National Film Award for the Best Film in 2008. He had also worked with other well- known directors like T. K. Rajeev Kumar, Shaji Kailas, Suresh Krishna.

Arun was nominated for Shantharam Award and National Award for best editing (Kancheevaram).
Arun is the winner of 2011 Asianet Ujala Film Award & Mathrubhumi-Kalyan Film Award for the Best Editor.

Family
He has a daughter, Arsha Nayar.

Awards
 2013 – Asiavision Awards – Special Jury Award
 2012 – IFFK - NETPAC Award for Best Malayalam Film – Ee Adutha Kalathu

Filmography

Director

Producer

Editor

References

External links 
 

Film editors from Kerala
Living people
1977 births
Malayalam film editors
Malayalam film directors
21st-century Indian film directors
Malayalam film producers
Film directors from Thiruvananthapuram
Film producers from Thiruvananthapuram